Brigid Hughes is a Brooklyn, New York-based literary editor. Hughes is best known for assuming the executive editor role at literary journal The Paris Review after the death of founding editor George Plimpton and for founding the literary magazine A Public Space in 2006.

Early life and education 
Hughes was born and grew up in Buffalo, New York. Her parents were Patrick Hughes, a doctor, and Patricia Hughes, a research nurse.

In 1990, she graduated from the Nichols School.

In 1994, Hughes received a bachelor's degree in English from Northwestern University.

Career 
After graduating from Northwestern University, Hughes moved to New York and in 1995 started a job as an intern at The Paris Review before being hired there full-time later that year.

For three years she served as managing editor. After the death of editor George Plimpton, Hughes became executive editor.  As de facto editor (she declined to use the title "editor" out of respect for Plimpton), she continued its tradition of accepting unsolicited submissions (the 'slush pile') as an important part of the role of smaller journals to promote new writers. Hughes left the executive editor position after only one year, when the (newly created) Board of Directors did not renew her contract, appointing Philip Gourevitch.

After leaving The Paris Review, Hughes founded A Public Space, a nonprofit quarterly English-language literary magazine based in Brooklyn, New York, in 2006. Under Hughes' editorship, A Public Space has gained a reputation for spotting and publishing writers before they become widely known – twice National Book Award winner Jesmyn Ward, whose first published short story, "Cattle Haul," appeared in A Public Space in January 2008, being one example.

In 2007, Hughes was co-curator with Peter Conroy and Jake Perlin of the Between the Lines arts festival at the Brooklyn Academy of Music. She is a frequent speaker and panelist at literary conferences, including the Lannan Foundation conference in 2010, and the PEN America literary conference, Literary Quartet: Two on Two, in 2014.

As of 2012, Hughes is a contributing editor to Graywolf Press.

Works and publications

References 

Living people
Northwestern University alumni
People from Brooklyn
American literary editors
Writers from Buffalo, New York
Year of birth missing (living people)